Álvaro Cuadros Morata (born 12 April 1995) is a Spanish former cyclist, who competed as a professional from 2014 to 2022.

Major results

2013
 3rd Time trial, National Junior Road Championships
2015
 2nd Overall Carpathian Couriers Race
1st  Young rider classification
 10th Overall East Bohemia Tour
2017
 2nd Road race, National Under-23 Road Championships
2018
 8th Circuito de Getxo
2021
 1st  Mountains classification Route d'Occitanie
  Combativity award Stage 13 Vuelta a España

Grand Tour general classification results timeline

References

External links

1995 births
Living people
Spanish male cyclists
Cyclists from Andalusia
Sportspeople from Granada